Shawn Campbell may refer to:

Shawn William Campbell, basketball player
Shawn Campbell (actor) in .45 (film)
Shawn Campbell (comedian), see Humber College Comedy: Writing and Performance

See also
Shaun Campbell (disambiguation)
Sean Campbell (disambiguation)